The Stanley Cup Finals in ice hockey (also known as the Stanley Cup Final among various media) is the National Hockey League's (NHL) championship series to determine the winner of the Stanley Cup, North America's oldest professional sports trophy.

Originally inscribed the Dominion Hockey Challenge Cup, the trophy was donated in 1892 by Lord Stanley of Preston, then–Governor General of Canada, initially as a "challenge trophy" for Canada's top-ranking amateur ice hockey club. The champions held onto the Cup until they either lost their league title to another club, or a champion from another league issued a formal challenge and defeated the reigning Cup champion in a final game to claim their win.

Professional teams first became eligible to challenge for the Stanley Cup in 1906. Starting in 1915, the Cup was officially held between the champion of the National Hockey Association (NHA) and the champion of the Pacific Coast Hockey Association (PCHA). After a series of league mergers and folds, it became the championship trophy of the National Hockey League (NHL) in 1926. Starting in 1982, the championship round of the NHL's playoffs has been a best-of-seven series played between the champions of the Eastern and Western Conferences. Western champions have won 21 times, while the Eastern champions have won 19 times.

History
The Stanley Cup was first awarded to the Montreal Hockey Club in 1893 when the team won the 1893 AHAC season. The team then had to defend its champion-title both through league championships and challenge games organised by the Stanley Cup trustees. Until 1912, these challenges could take place before or during a league season. After 1912, the trustees ordered that challenges only take place after all league games were completed.

The last challenge, in 1914, was the inauguration of the first "World Series" of ice hockey, a series between the Stanley Cup and league champion Toronto Hockey Club of the National Hockey Association (NHA) and the Victoria Aristocrats, champions of the Pacific Coast Hockey Association (PCHA). The series was pre-arranged between the two leagues before the season after post-season exhibitions held in their previous seasons. The inaugural series was to be held in the city of the NHA champion, and alternate annually following the series.

After the series got under way, there was some concern that the series would not produce an "official" Stanley Cup champion. The Victoria club had not formally applied to the Stanley Cup trustees to challenge for the Cup. A letter arrived from the Stanley Cup trustees on March 17, that the trustees would not let the Stanley Cup travel west, because they did not consider Victoria a proper challenger, as they had not verified themselves with the trustees. However, on March 18, trustee William Foran stated that it was a misunderstanding. PCHA president Lester Patrick, PCHA President, had not filed a challenge, because he had expected Emmett Quinn of the NHA to make all of the arrangements in his role as hockey commissioner, whereas the trustees thought they were being purposely ignored. The Victoria challenge was accepted. Any tension was diffused as Toronto successfully defended the Cup by sweeping a best-of-five series in three games. This began the end of the influence of the Stanley Cup trustees on the challengers and series for the Cup. In March 1914, trustee William Foran wrote to NHA president Emmett Quinn that the trustees are "perfectly satisfied to allow the representatives of the three pro leagues (NHA, PCHA and Maritime) to make all arrangements each season as to the series of matches to be played for the Cup."

Victoria vs. Toronto

All games played at Arena Gardens in Toronto.

Part of their 1913 agreement to set up drafting and player rights ownership, the NHA and PCHA leagues agreed to have their respective champions face each other for the Cup. At the same time, the NHA concluded a similar agreement with the Maritime Hockey League but the MHL champions abandoned their 1914 challenge and did not challenge again. From 1914 onwards, the Stanley Cup championship finals alternated between the East and the West each year, with alternating games played according to NHA and PCHA rules. The Cup trustees agreed to this new arrangement, because after the Allan Cup became the highest prize for amateur hockey teams in Canada, the trustees had become dependent on the top two professional leagues to bolster the prominence of the trophy. After the Portland Rosebuds, an American-based team, joined the PCHA in 1914, the trustees issued a statement that the Cup was no longer for the best team in Canada, but now for the best team in the world. Two years later, the Rosebuds became the first American team to play in the Stanley Cup championship finals. In 1917, the Seattle Metropolitans became the first American team to win the Cup. After that season, the NHA dissolved, and the National Hockey League (NHL) took its place.

In 1919, the Spanish influenza epidemic forced the Montreal Canadiens and the Seattle Metropolitans to cancel their series tied at 2–2–1, marking the first time the Stanley Cup was not awarded.

The format for the Stanley Cup championship changed in 1922, with the creation of the Western Canada Hockey League (WCHL). Now three leagues competed for the Cup and this necessitated a semi-final series between two league champions, with the third having a bye directly to the finals. In 1924, the PCHA and the WCHL merged to form the Western Hockey League (WHL) and the championship reverted to a single series. After winning in the 1924–25 season, the Victoria Cougars became the last team outside the NHL to win the Stanley Cup.

The WHL folded in 1926, and most of the players moved to the NHL. This left the NHL as the only league left competing for the Cup. Other leagues and clubs have issued challenges, but from that year forward, no non-NHL team has played for it, leading it to become the de facto championship trophy of the NHL. In 1947, the NHL reached an agreement with trustees P. D. Ross and Cooper Smeaton to grant control of the cup to the NHL, allowing the league itself to reject challenges from other leagues that may have wished to play for the Cup. A 2006 Ontario Superior Court case found that the trustees had gone against Lord Stanley's conditions in the 1947 agreement. The NHL has agreed to allow other teams to play for the Cup should the league not be operating, as was the case in the 2004–05 NHL lockout.

Broadcasting

English-language coverage was aired by the Canadian Broadcasting Corporation (CBC), with Danny Gallivan calling the play-by-play, Keith Dancy providing the colour commentary, and Wes McKnight hosted. The Hockey Night in Canada team of Gallivan and Dancy called the next eight finals. Hockey Night in Canada on CBC remains the exclusive English-language broadcaster across Canada despite 1972 when a lengthy NABET strike forced coverage to be instead aired on CTV, from 1985 to 1988 when the series was split between CBC and either CTV or Global TV, and since 2015 when it became a Rogers Media-produced broadcast under a sub-license agreement.

French-language broadcasts in Canada also began in 1953, with play-by-play commentator René Lecavalier and colour commentator Jean-Maurice Bailly on CBC's Télévision de Radio-Canada (SRC) division. SRC continued to be the exclusive French-language broadcaster until  when Réseau des sports (RDS) took over. Since 2015, under a sub-license agreement with Rogers, TVA has been the exclusive home of French-language broadcasts in Canada.

However, national coverage on American television, like the rest of the NHL season, remained in a state of flux for decades. From 1966 to 1975, NBC and CBS held the rights at various times, but they each only covered selected games of the series. It was then carried on syndication from 1976 to 1979 through the 1970s NHL Network. In 1980, the Hughes broadcast network simulcast CBC's feed before the series was moved to cable. During its time on cable from 1980 to 1993, rights to the series was held at various times by USA, SportsChannel America, and ESPN, but there was no exclusive coverage of games and thus local broadcasters could also still televise them regionally as well. In , Fox signed on to be the exclusive national broadcast network of selected games of the final round, splitting it with ESPN.

Timeline of national broadcasters

Series format

The championship series began with the interleague 'World Series' played in one city. The series alternated between a rink of the NHA and later the NHL and a rink of the PCHA and later the WCHL/WHL. It was not until the demise of the WHL, that the final series alternated games between the two finalists' home ice.

The series allowed ties until 1928. As the two and later three leagues differed, the series would alternate using each league's rules. The PCHA continued to use seven-man team play, and games would alternate with six and seven-man games.

After the NHL became the last remaining league to compete for the Cup, the trophy was then awarded to the winner of the NHL's championship playoff round. This first took place in 1927 between the Boston Bruins and the Ottawa Senators, which was planned to be a best-of-three series, although the series allowed ties. The series ended after four games, when the Senators defeated the Bruins in the fourth game.

The NHL has changed its playoff format several times since 1927, and thus the final round has not always pitted conference or division playoff champions against each other. In the playoff format used from 1929 to 1938, the two teams with identical division ranking would face each other (i.e. the first place teams played each other, the second place teams play each other, and likewise for the third place teams). The winner of the first place series would automatically advance to the final round. The winner of the second and third place series would then play each other, with the winner of that series earning the other berth to the championship round.

During the Original Six era, the top four teams made the playoffs, with the first and third place teams battling in one semifinal series, while the second and fourth place teams battled in the other. And from 1975 to 1981, all the playoff teams were seeded regardless of division or conference. From 1982 to 2020, the NHL's final round pitted the league's two conference playoff champions. In 2021, the league temporarily realigned due the COVID-19 pandemic, as a result the four playoff division champions were re-seeded and played in the Semifinals, with the winners of those series advancing to the finals. The league then returned to the previous conference based playoff format in 2022.

Champions

Notes
1. The NHL includes the Toronto Hockey Club (Toronto Arenas) 1918 win and the 1922 Toronto St. Patricks win in the Toronto Maple Leafs total.
2. The Chicago Blackhawks were known as the Chicago Black Hawks before the 1986–87 season.
3. The Montreal Canadiens totals include the 1919 finals that ended with a no-decision because of the Spanish flu epidemic.

Records

Team
Most wins: Montreal Canadiens (24)
Most losses: Boston Bruins (14)
Fewest losses: Colorado Avalanche (0)
Most consecutive wins: Montreal Canadiens (5 in 1956–1960)
Most consecutive losses: Toronto Maple Leafs (3 in 1938–1940), St. Louis Blues (3 in 1968–1970)
Most consecutive appearances: Montreal Canadiens (10 in 1951–1960)
Most consecutive appearances without a loss: Montreal Canadiens (9 from 1968 to 1986)
Most consecutive appearances without a win: Toronto Maple Leafs (6 from 1933 to 1940), Detroit Red Wings (6 from 1956 to 1995), Philadelphia Flyers (6 from 1976 to 2010)
Most seasons between wins: New York Rangers (54 between 1940 and 1994, if not Toronto Maple Leafs below)
Most seasons between appearances: Toronto Maple Leafs (55 between 1967–present, excluding 2004-05 season)

Stanley Cup Finals consecutive appearances

Individual
Career
 Most years in finals (12) - Maurice Richard, Red Kelly, Jean Beliveau, Henri Richard
 Most games played in finals (65) - Red Kelly, Henri Richard
 Most consecutive games in finals (53) - Bernie Geoffrion
 Most career points in finals (62) - Jean Beliveau
 Most career goals in finals (34) - Maurice Richard
 Most career assists in finals (35) - Wayne Gretzky
 Most career game-winning goals in finals (9) - Jean Beliveau
 Most career shutouts in finals (8) - Clint Benedict

 Series
 Most points, one series (13) - Wayne Gretzky (1988)
 Most goals, one series (14) - Bernie Morris (1917) 
 Most assists, one series (10) - Wayne Gretzky (1988)
 Most shutouts, one series (3) - Clint Benedict (1926), Frank McCool (1945), Martin Brodeur (2003)

See also 
 List of Stanley Cup champions
 List of Stanley Cup challenge games
 List of NHL franchise post-season droughts

Notes

References

Citations

Sources

External links

 
Finals
Annual sporting events in the United States